Brian Arthur Mills (25 October 1933 – 3 June 2006) was a British television director, mainly for Granada Television. His credits (as director) include Strangers, Bulman, First Among Equals, Coronation Street and Granada's Sherlock Holmes series. He was the only television director to direct episodes of Coronation Street in each of its first five decades.

He was married to the stage and TV actress Brigit Forsyth, although they separated in 1999; seven years before his death on 3 June 2006 aged 72.

References

External links
 

1933 births
2006 deaths
British television directors